Kord Kandi, Kard Kandi, Kurd Kandi, Kurdkandi, Kardkandi, Kordkandi, also rendered as Kurd-Kandi, may refer to various places in Iran:
 Kord Kandi, Ardabil
 Kard Kandi, Germi, Ardabil Province
 Kord Kandi, Bostanabad, East Azerbaijan Province
 Kord Kandi, Charuymaq, East Azerbaijan Province
 Kord Kandi, Tabriz, East Azerbaijan Province
 Kordkandi, Isfahan
 Kord Kandi, Chaldoran, West Azerbaijan Province
 Kord Kandi, Miandoab, West Azerbaijan Province
 Kord Kandi, Shahin Dezh, West Azerbaijan Province
 Kord Kandi, Showt, West Azerbaijan Province
 Kord Kandi, Zanjan